Phung may refer to:

 Phùng, a Vietnamese surname
 Phùng (township), Đan Phượng District, Hà Nội, Vietnam
 Phung River (disambiguation), several rivers in Thailand

See also
Feng (disambiguation)